An ellipsoidal dome is a dome (also see geodesic dome), which has a bottom cross-section which is a circle, but has a cupola whose curve is an ellipse.

There are two types of ellipsoidal domes: prolate ellipsoidal domes and oblate ellipsoidal domes. A prolate ellipsoidal dome is derived by rotating an ellipse around the long axis of the ellipse; an oblate ellipsoidal dome is derived by rotating an ellipse around the short axis of the ellipse.

Of small note, in reflecting telescopes the mirror is usually elliptical, so has the form of a "hollow" ellipsoidal dome.

The Jameh Mosque of Yazd has an ellipsoidal dome.

See also

 Beehive tomb
 Clochán
 Cloister vault
 Dome
 Ellipsoid
 Ellipsoidal coordinates
 Elliptical dome
 Geodesic dome
 Geodesics on an ellipsoid
 Great ellipse
 Onion dome
 Spherical cap
 Spheroid

References

External links and references

 One calculation site, for oblate and prolate ellipsoidal domes

Domes
Architectural elements